Brazil national team may refer to:

Brazil national American football team
Brazil national baseball team
Brazil men's national basketball team
Brazil women's national basketball team
Brazil national football team
Brazil women's national football team
Brazil men's national handball team
Brazil women's national handball team
Brazil national rugby union team
Brazil women's national rugby union team
Brazil men's national volleyball team
Brazil women's national volleyball team